J. Aaron Regunberg (born January 26, 1990) is an American progressive activist and politician who served as the member of the Rhode Island House of Representatives for the 4th district from 2015 to 2019. He was a candidate for the Democratic nomination for lieutenant governor of Rhode Island in 2018.

Early life and education 
Regunberg is a native of Rhode Island. His father died in a plane crash before he was born, and his grandfather immigrated to the United States to escape The Holocaust. He earned a Bachelor of Arts degree from Brown University and became a student at Harvard Law School in the fall of 2019.

Career
In 2010 he co-founded the Providence Student Union, a youth-led public school student advocacy organization that has organized around issues including ethnic studies curricula, infrastructure repairs, free student bus passes, and an end to school closings and high-stakes testing.

Rhode Island House of Representatives
In 2014, Regunberg was elected to serve Rhode Island House District 4 on the East Side of Providence.

Elections
In the race for Rhode Island House District 4, Regunberg won 51.5% of the vote in the Democratic Primary against challengers, Heather Tow-Yick and Miriam Ross, who won 33.9% and 14.6% respectively. Regunberg received the endorsement of Progressive Democrats of Rhode Island, Clean Water Action, Planned Parenthood, and progressive labor organizations. Regunberg went on to defeat independent candidate Ethan Gyles in the General Election, 83% to 17%.
Regunberg ran unopposed in the Democratic Primary and in the General Election for Rhode Island House District 4.

Tenure
During his first term as State Representative, he introduced and passed legislation raising Rhode Island's tipped minimum wage for the first time in 20 years, establishing online voter registration, and creating new renewable energy programs. Regunberg also introduced and passed legislation to guarantee earned paid sick days for over 100,000 Rhode Islanders, and has pushed for a state-level carbon pricing system, and a more progressive tax system, among other proposals. He also chaired a special legislative study commission to reform the use of solitary confinement in Rhode Island.

Regunberg served as a member of the Rules Committee for the Democratic National Convention in July 2016, where he was a leader in the campaign to reform the Democratic Party's use of superdelegates in future presidential nominating contests.

Since the election of Donald Trump, Aaron Regunberg has been working locally to resist the Trump administration's agenda. He co-founded Resist Hate RI, a coalition of activists and organizations that has mobilized hundreds of Rhode Island residents to take state and federal action in opposition to the Trump administration. He has introduced legislation that would divest Rhode Island from any companies that contract to help build Trump's proposed border wall with Mexico.

Regunberg received a 74% score from Common Cause Rhode Island in their 2015-2016 legislative scorecard, and an A rating from the Environmental Council of Rhode Island.

Committee assignments
2015
For the 2015 legislative session, Regunberg served on the following Rhode Island House of Representatives committees:
 Environment and Natural Resources
 Health, Education and Welfare
2017
During the 2017 legislative session, Regunberg served on the following Rhode Island House of Representatives committees:
 Environment and Natural Resources
 Labor

Campaign for lieutenant governor 
In late October 2017, Regunberg announced that he would run to become the lieutenant governor of Rhode Island in the 2018 election. He ran against incumbent Lieutenant Governor Dan Mckee in the Democratic Primary. In his announcement speech, Regunberg said that if elected he would be a voice "for all of the Rhode Islanders who can’t afford that State House lobbyist," and campaigned on a progressive platform, including as one of the earliest supporters of a Green New Deal. His bid received national attention when CNN named it one of the "9 Democratic primaries to watch in 2018."

Regunberg's campaign was endorsed by many progressive organizations and politicians throughout Rhode Island.

In March 2018, Regunberg received the endorsement of the Mayor of Providence, Jorge Elorza.

Regunberg was defeated in the Democratic primary election by incumbent Lieutenant Governor Daniel McKee. Regunberg received 49% of the vote to Mckee's 51%.

Since the election, Regunberg served as a senior policy advisor to Providence Mayor Jorge Elorza. In the summer of 2019, he was arrested as a part of a Never Again Action protest against President Donald Trump's immigration reforms.

References

External links 

Official website
Rhode Island General Assembly Biography

Brown University alumni
Democratic Party members of the Rhode Island House of Representatives
1991 births
Living people
21st-century American politicians
Harvard Law School alumni